Thala malvacea is a species of small sea snail, marine gastropod mollusk in the family Costellariidae, the ribbed miters.

Description
The length of the shell attains 9.8 mm.

Distribution
This marine species occurs off Djibouti.

References

 Turner H. (2001) Katalog der Familie Costellariidae Macdonald 1860 (Gastropoda: Prosobranchia: Muricoidea). Hackenheim: Conchbooks. 100 pp.

External links
 Jousseaume, F. (1898). Description d'un mollusque nouveau. Le Naturaliste. 20[= ser. 2, 12 (268): 106-107.]
 Blatterer H. (2019). Mollusca of the Dahab region (Gulf of Aqaba, Red Sea). Denisia. 43: 1-480

Costellariidae
Gastropods described in 1898